Mustafa Kemal Atatürk (1881 – 10 November 1938) founded the Republic of Turkey, and served as its president from 1923 until his death on 10 November 1938. His personal life has been the subject of numerous studies. According to Turkish historian Kemal H. Karpat, Atatürk's recent bibliography included 7,010 different sources. Atatürk's personal life has its controversies, ranging from where he was born to his correct full name. The details of his marriage have always been a subject of debate. His religious beliefs were discussed in Turkish political life as recently as the Republic Protests during the 2007 presidential election.

Mustafa Kemal's personality has been an important subject both for scholars and the general public. Much of substantial personal information about him comes from memoirs by his associates, who were at times his rivals, and friends. Some credible information originates from Ali Fuat Cebesoy, Kâzım Karabekir, Halide Edib Adıvar, Kılıç Ali, Falih Rıfkı Atay, Afet İnan, there is also secondary analysis by Patrick Balfour, the 3rd Baron Kinross, Andrew Mango and, most recently, Vamık D. Volkan and Norman Itzkowitz.

Name

In Turkish tradition, names have additional honorary or memorial values besides their grammatical identification function. It is possible to translate a name from Turkish to other languages, but care should be given as names' form varies from one language to another. Atatürk had Mustafa as his name at birth. Mustafa ( – Muṣṭafā, "the chosen one"), an epithet of the Islamic prophet Muhammad, was a common name at that time. Young Mustafa studied at Salonica Military School, the military junior high school in Salonica (now Thessaloniki in modern Greece), where his mathematics teacher Captain Üsküplü Mustafa Sabri Bey gave him the additional name "Kemal" ("perfection") because of his student's academic excellence.

On 27 November 1911, Mustafa Kemal was promoted to the rank of Binbaşı, an Ottoman military rank denoting the commander of "a thousand soldiers," equivalent to the rank of Major in the modern Turkish army. Since, in Ottoman military ranks, "Bey" was a common title given to all ranks for Binbaşı and above, Mustafa Kemal Efendi, henceforth, was addressed as "Mustafa Kemal Bey". On 1 April 1916, Mustafa Kemal was promoted to the rank of Mirliva, equivalent to Major General today. In Ottoman military ranks, Pasha was a common title given to all ranks at and above Mirliva, and he was from then on addressed as "Mustafa Kemal Pasha".

Kemal Pasha, disgusted by the capitulations and concessions made by the Sultan to the Allies, and by the occupation of Constantinople (known as Istanbul in English since 1930) by the British, resigned from his post on 8 July 1919. He escaped from Istanbul by sea, passing through British Royal Navy patrols and landing on the Black Sea port city of Samsun, to organize the resistance against the Allied Powers' occupation of Anatolia. After his resignation, the Sublime Porte, the Ottoman imperial government, issued a warrant and later condemned him to death in absentia.

On 19 September 1921, the Turkish Grand National Assembly presented him with the title of Gazi, which denotes, a combat or wounded veteran, with the religious connotation of defeating non-Islamic forces, and bestowed upon him the rank of Marshal for his achievements during the War of Independence. Henceforth, he'd be addressed as "Gazi Mustafa Kemal".

On 21 June 1934, the Grand National Assembly recognized the need for registration and use of fixed hereditary surnames. The Surname Law was proposed and later put into force. On 24 November 1934, the Assembly enacted a special law to bestow on Mustafa Kemal the surname "Atatürk," which translates as "Father of the Turks," and established "Atatürk" as a unique surname.

List of names and titles

 Birth: Ali Rıza oğlu Mustafa
 1890s: Mustafa Kemal
 1911: Mustafa Kemal Bey
 1916: Mustafa Kemal Paşa
 1921: Gazi Mustafa Kemal Paşa
 1934: Kemal Atatürk
 1935: Kamâl Atatürk
 1937: Kemal Atatürk

Time magazine says: "Man of Seven Names. This blond, blue-eyed, Bacchic roughneck had seven names before he died as Kamâl Atatürk." However, Atatürk returned to the old spelling of Kemal from May 1937 and onwards.

Birth date

Due to differences between calendars of the period, Atatürk's precise birth date is not known. The Ottoman Empire recognized the Hijri calendar and the Rumi calendar. The Hijri was an Islamic calendar, used to mark the religious holidays. It was lunar, with years of 354 or 355 days. The Rumi was a civil calendar, adopted in 1839. It was solar, based on the Julian Calendar. Both counted time from the Hijra, the migration of Muhammad to Medina. Between the two calendars significant differences in elapsed time were present. Various reforms were made to reconcile them but typically there was always a difference.

Atatürk's birth date was recorded in the public records of Turkish Selanik as Anno Hegirae 1296 with no sign whether this was based on the Rumi or on the Hijri calendar. In view of this confusion Atatürk set his own birthday to coincide with the Turkish Independence Day, which he announced was 19 May 1919, the day of his arrival in Samsun, in a speech given in 1927. His identification with Independence Day implied his selection of the civil calendar, in which AH 1296 lasts from 13 March 1880 to 12 March 1881. The latter dates are in the Gregorian Calendar just adopted for the Republic by Atatürk for purposes of standardization (the Julian Calendar was rejected earlier). Atatürk therefore listed his own birthday in all documents official and unofficial as 19 May 1881.

Atatürk was told by his mother that he was born on a spring day, but his younger sister Makbule Atadan was told by others that he was born at night during a thunderstorm. Faik Reşit Unat received differing responses from Zübeyde Hanım's neighbors at Salonika. Some claimed that he was born on a spring day, but others stated on a winter day during either January or February. A date that has gained some acceptance is 19 May, a date which originated with the historian Reşit Saffet Atabinen. 19 May is the symbolic start of the Turkish Independence War, and Atabinen linked Atatürk's birth day to the start of the Independence War – a gesture which Atatürk appreciated. There was even a plan to establish a "Gazi" day. Another story about this date is that a teacher asked Atatürk his birth date, that he responded he did not know it, and that the teacher suggested 19 May. Then again, there are two ways to interpret this; the "Gregorian 19 May 1881" would imply Rumi 1 March 1297, which conflicts with the only recorded information, Rumi 1296. It is also possible to say "Rumi 19 May 1296", which implies a date in the Gregorian year 1880.

Some sources ignore the day and month altogether, and print his birth date as Gregorian 1880/81. Other claims are:
 Enver Behnan Şapolyo claimed that Atatürk was born on Gregorian 23 December 1880.
 Şevket Süreyya Aydemir claimed that he was born on Gregorian 4 January 1881.
 Muhtar Kumral, former head of the Mustafa Kemal Association, claimed that he was born on Gregorian 13 March 1881, and stated they used Makbule Atadan. A conversion from Gregorian to Rumi sets the day in Rumi to 1 March 1297. The validity of this claim is questionable, since the written record states Rumi 1296, not 1297.
 Tevfik Rüştü Aras claimed that Atatürk was born between 10 May and 20 May. He stated that this information was shared with Atatürk, and that Atatürk responded "Why not May 19."

The memoirs of the Soviet diplomat Simon Aralov mention a conversation between Aralov and Atatürk, where Aralov says he was born in 1880, and Atatürk responds "just like me".

Atatürk's last official identity document does not include the day and month, but the year 1881 is visible. It is exhibited in the Atatürk Museum in Şişli. The Republic of Turkey announced 19 May 1881 officially to the public and diplomatically to other countries as his accepted birthday.

Nationality
The Ottoman Empire was not a national state and the records were not kept based on nationality, but on religion. The rise of nationalism in Europe had extended to the Ottoman Empire during the 19th century and the Millet system began to degrade. Atatürk's parents and relatives used Turkish as their native language and were part of the Muslim millet. His father Ali Rıza Efendi is thought by some to have been of Albanian or Slavic origin; however, according to Falih Rıfkı Atay, Vamık D. Volkan and Norman Itzkowitz, Ali Rıza's ancestors were Turks, ultimately descending from Söke in the Aydın Province. His mother Zübeyde is thought to have been of Turkish origin and according to Şevket Süreyya Aydemir, she was of Yörük ancestry. There are also some suggestions about his partial Slavic origin.

Early life

Atatürk was born during the Belle Époque of European civilization. Russia was implementing reforms; Japan opened its doors to the West during the Meiji Restoration. The Ottoman Empire was going through transformation. Ottoman military reform efforts, like the contemporaneous Modernization of Japanese Military 1868–1931, managed to develop a modern army. Racial, regional, ethnic and national stereotypes were part of discourse throughout the world. Ottoman people were not immune to these developments and there was a rise of nationalism under the Ottoman Empire.

The Ottoman State had been weakened by Turkish Islamism. Conservatism was strong both in government and society. Although the empire was transforming itself, the Hippocratic school of medicine, Ptolemaic astronomy and geography, and other branches of medieval studies were still in force. Many of these studies had been first amended, then discarded in western Europe with the Age of Enlightenment. Except for European military technology, the penetration of European ideas and practices into Turkey was slow.

Preparatory school

Ali Rıza Bey's desire was to send Atatürk to the newly opened Şemsi Efendi School, which had a contemporary education program. Zübeyde Hanım wanted him to attend a traditional school. The traditional Muslim schools had programs based on mostly prayers and hymns. This caused arguments within the family. He first enrolled in a traditional religious school. He later switched to Şemsi Efendi School.

In 1888, Ali Rıza Efendi died at an age of 47. Atatürk was 7 years old. Zübeyde Hanım was 31. Zübeyde Hanım and her two children lived with her brother Hüseyin for a period. Hüseyin was the manager of a farm outside Salonika. Mustafa worked on the farm.

Zübeyde Hanım married Ragıp Bey. Ragıp Bey was also a widower with four children. Atatürk liked Süreyya. His other step brother was employed by Regie Company. Because he was not the senior male in the house after his mother's marriage, Atatürk left the house and lived with a relative.

Military education

Atatürk wanted to attend the military school. As a young boy, he admired the Western-style uniforms of the military officers. He enrolled to the military junior high school  in Selânik. In 1896, he enrolled in the Monastir Military High School. Monastir is today's Bitola, in the North Macedonia. Both of these regions saw discontent and revolts towards the Ottoman administration.

On 13 March 1899, he enrolled in the Ottoman War Academy in Constantinople. It was a boarding school with dormitories within its premises. The military school was strictly controlled by Abdul Hamid II. Newspapers were not allowed in the school, and textbooks were the only accepted books. The school not only taught military skills but also religious practices and social work. The curriculum at this school demanded either donating money or working for charity. He graduated from the Ottoman War Academy in 1902.

On 10 February 1902, he enrolled in the Imperial Military Staff College in Constantinople, from which he graduated on 11 January 1905. There were two officer tracks in the Ottoman imperial army. One of them was the officers "educated within the army itself", Alaylı, and the other consisted of officers trained in modern military schools, Mektepli. He was a "school trained" officer. School educated officers had a strong ideological imprint toward family and country, and he had shown tendencies toward both. When he joined the Ottoman Army, he had already passed 13 years of military education.

Family

Zübeyde Hanım's first child was Fatma, then Ömer, later Ahmet was born. They all died in early childhood. Mustafa was the fourth child. Makbule followed him in 1885. Their sister Naciye was born in 1889. Naciye was lost to childhood tuberculosis.

Ragıp Bey had four children from his first marriage. His first child, Süreyya died during World War One. Ragıp Bey had a brother Colonel Hüsamettin. He and Vasfiye Hanım had a daughter named Fikriye (1897 – 31 May 1924). Of the 9 siblings, five sharing at least one parent, only his biological sister, Makbule (1885–1956), survived him.

Wife

Atatürk married only once, to Latife Uşaklıgil (or Uşşaki); a multilingual, and self-confident woman who was educated in Europe and came from an established, ship-owning family from Smyrna (now Izmir).

Atatürk met Latife during the recapture of occupied Smyrna on 8 September 1922. Kemal was invited to Uşaklıgil residence during his stay in Smyrna. He had chance to observe Latife closely. Their initial acquaintanceship period lasted a relatively short time as he had to return to Angora (now Ankara) on 2 October. Kemal opened up his interest to Latife by asking her "Don't go anywhere. Wait for me." On 29 January 1923, he arranged for the permission to marry from her family, with the assistance of the chief of staff Fevzi Çakmak. Kâzım Karabekir was present at their wedding. These were not random decisions.

In Turkish culture, the groom asks his family or respected people, with whom he has close relationships, to perform this act. Latife did not cover her face during the wedding, though during this period it was the tradition for brides to do so. They did not have a honeymoon just after the wedding. The elections for the parliament were coming. He received the representatives of local newspapers next day of his wedding. He prepared for his public speech on 2 February. The honeymoon, an Anatolian tour, was a chance to show his wife's unveiled face as a role model for modern Turkish women. "It's not just a honeymoon, it's a lesson in reform," one observer remarked.

As a First Lady, she was part of the women's emancipation movement, which started in Turkey in the early 1920s. Latife showed her face to the world with a defiance that shocked and delighted onlookers. She did not wear a hijab but covered her head with a headscarf. She urged Turkish women to do the same and lobbied for women's suffrage. Atatürk passed the law giving women the right to vote after he was elected. 

Latife insisted on accompanying him to the eastern towns even though the wives of other officials stopped at Samsun and did not travel further to the devastated east. The attention of Atatürk was directed to conventional gatherings. The balance was hard to establish. At Erzurum, Latife and Kemal reached a breaking point. They had a public quarrel. Atatürk asked Latife to go to Angora, with his trusted ADC Salih Bozok. They were divorced on 5 August 1925. The circumstances of their divorce remain publicly unknown. A 25-year-old court order banned the publishing of his former wife's diaries and letters, which might have contained information on the matter. The Turkish History Foundation kept the letters since 1975. Upon expiration of the court order, the Turkish History Foundation said that Latife Uşaklıgil's family demanded that the letters were not to be disclosed.

Children

One of his quotes was "Children are a new beginning of tomorrow." He established 23 April as "Children's Day" and 19 May as "Youth and Sports Day". Children's Day commemorates the opening of Turkish Grand National Assembly in 1920. The designation of Children's Day came in 1929 upon the recommendation of the Institution of Children's Protection. Both days are celebrated today. Youth and Sports Day is a national holiday in Turkey.

He had no biological children from his marriage but had eight adopted daughters and one son. The names of his children were Zehra Aylin, Sabiha (Gökçen), Rukiye (Erkin), Afet (İnan), Nebile (Bayyurt), Afife, Fikriye, Ülkü (Doğançay, later Adatepe), and Mustafa. Additionally, he had two children under his protection, Abdurrahim Tuncak and İhsan.

In 1916, Atatürk took Abdurrahim, aged eight, under his protection. There is a photograph showing Atatürk with his uniform during his assignment in Diyarbakir accompanied with the early teenage Abdurrahim. Abdurrahim was entrusted to Zübeyde Hanim's care. He did not remember his biological parents. This brought questions if he was left an orphan during the Caucasus Campaign. Abdurrahim stated his earliest memories belong to the Zübeyde Hanim's house in Akarether. Atatürk gave the surname Tuncak to Abdurrahim.

In 1924, Zehra from Amasya and Rukiye from Konya came under his protection. Zehra fell to her death from a train near Amiens on 20 November 1935. France police inquiry concluded that it was a suicide rather than an accident. On 22 September 1925, Atatürk adopted a 12-year-old girl named Sabiha, an orphan who approached him at Bursa train station. She was sent to Russia for aviation training. On 25 October 1925, Atatürk met an 18-year-old girl, Afet (İnan). She was the daughter of a close family friend. She had lost her mother, and her father had married another woman. She was trying to make a living in Smyrna (Izmir) by teaching young girls. She lacked advanced education. Atatürk supported her advance education expenses, while she continued to support herself by teaching. Later, she became a trusted person. He asked her to copy edit his speeches, and dictate his materials. In 1935, Atatürk met a three-year-old girl, Ülkü. She was the child of a retainer of his mother and the stationmaster. She was the only daughter that stayed close to him until a few weeks before his death.

According to Atatürk:There is one trait I have had since my childhood. In the house where I lived. I never liked to spend time with my sister or with a friend. Since my childhood I have always preferred to be alone and independent, that is how I always lived. I have another trait: I have never had any patience with any advice or admonition which my mother – my father died very early – my sister or any of my closest relatives pressed on me according to their lights. People who live with their families know that there are never short of innocent and sincere warnings from left and right. There are only two ways of dealing with them. You either ignore them or obey them. I believe neither way is right.One changing view about Atatürk is his foresightedness, foster and promotion of the leadership among Turkish revolutionaries. Initial reviews depict him as an unchallenged leader, the single man. Recent studies analyze the period from the populist perspective. His leadership activities had extending effects on the political, social and cultural context of the Republic. These studies gives clues on his abilities to foster the cooperation among different people, such as in the "History of National Struggle Volumes I through V". His significance during independence was cited for his ability to unify people. It is pointed out that organizations in the countryside for resistance against occupation was happening effectively before his involvement. His ability to channel people did not. The foundation for the civilian participation in the government [parliament being never closed during his reign] and establishment of civic society [his insistence of keeping military out of daily politics] are cited having the roots in the Kemal's presidency, not after. The failed reforms of the regional countries, after the passage of its leaders, were generally used as an example of the Atatürk's leadership among the Turkish Revolutionaries. His effect lasted many years after his passage.

Love of nature
He attached importance to his horse Sakarya and his dog Fox. He was also anecdotally linked to preservation of Turkish Angora after an article in the Turkey's Reader's Digest reportedly claimed that Atatürk said "his successor would be bitten on the ankle by an odd-eyed white cat.

Atatürk established the Forest Ranch in 1925. He wanted to have a modern farm in the suburbs of the capital including a green haven (arboretum) for people. The Forest Ranch developed a program to introduce domesticated livestock and horticulture in 1933. As a consequence of children being interested in the animals Atatürk involved in developing a program which then became known as "Ankara Zoo". The modern zoo which took 12 years to build, first of its kind in Turkey, gave a chance to people observe animals beyond the boundaries of circus and fairs. Atatürk, with his smallest adopted daughter Ülkü spend his time at the Forest Ranch and throughout the development stages of the Zoo until he died in 1938. The official opening was in 1945.

Lifestyle

Throughout most of his life, Atatürk was a moderate-to-heavy drinker, often consuming half a litre of rakı a day; he also smoked tobacco, predominantly in the form of cigarettes. He loved reading books, listening to music, dancing, horseback riding and swimming. He liked to play backgammon and billiards. He was interested in Zeybek dance, wrestling and Rumelian songs. In his free times, he read books about history. Instead of dealing with other issues, a politician who detested reading more than necessary told him, "Did you go to Samsun by reading a book?" Atatürk replied: "When I was a child, I was poor. When I received two pennies, I would give one penny of it to the book. If it was not so, I would not have done any of this."

Atatürk told the Romanian Foreign Minister of the time, Victor Antonescu, on 20 March 1937:

Religious beliefs

There is a controversy on Atatürk's religious beliefs. Some researchers have emphasized that his discourses about religion are periodic and that his positive views related to this subject are limited in the early 1920s.

Non-Turkish researchers, as well as some Turkish ones, insist that he was a religious skeptic and an agnostic, i.e. non-doctrinaire deist, maybe an atheist, or even anti-religious and anti-Islamic in general.

However, other Turkish researchers claim he was a devout Muslim. Atatürk's adopted daughter Ülkü Adatepe stated that Atatürk told her he would pray to Allah before every battle.

Expressing that he sees religion as a "necessary institution", Atatürk used expressions such as "our religion" and "our great religion" for Islam. According to governmental archives, in his two speeches in 1922 and 1923, he stated "Gentlemen, Allah is one and great."

In 1933, the US ambassador Charles H. Sherrill interviewed him. According to Sherill, in the interview, he denied being an agnostic and said that he thinks it is good for mankind to pray to God. According to Atatürk, the Turkish people do not know what Islam really is and do not read the Quran. People are influenced by Arabic sentences that they do not understand, and because of their customs they go to mosques. When the Turks read the Quran and think about it, they will leave Islam.

In his youth, he underwent religious training, though it was brief. His military training included religious imprinting. He knew the Arabic language well enough to understand and interpret the Quran. He studied the "History of Islam" by Leone Caetani and the "History of Islamic Civilisation" by Jurji Zaydan. He authored the chapter in "Islamic History" himself when he wanted history books for high schools prepared. Atatürk's religious knowledge was considerably high in its nature and level.

General perception
Atatürk believed that religion is an important institution:Religion is an important institution. A nation without religion cannot survive. Yet it is also very important to note that religion is a link between Allah and the individual believer. The brokerage of the pious cannot be permitted. Those who use religion for their own benefit are detestable. We are against such a situation and will not allow it. Those who use religion in such a manner have fooled our people; it is against just such people that we have fought and will continue to fight. Know that whatever conforms to reason, logic, and the advantages and needs of our people conforms equally to Islam. If our religion did not conform to reason and logic, it would not be the perfect religion, the final religion.However, his speeches and publications criticized using religion as a political ideology. According to him, "Religions have been basis of the tyranny of kings and sultans." He stated that religion should be in conformity with reason, science and logic. The problem was not religion, but how believers understood and applied religion. Atatürk expressed that religion and superstition should be separated:I want to say that the Turkish nation should be more religious, that is, they should be religious in all their simplicity. The truth is that religion does not contain anything that prevents progress. However, there is another religion among us that is more complex, artificial and consists of superstitions. If they cannot approach the light, they have lost themselves. We will save them.True religion could not be understood as long as false prophets isolated and religious knowledge is enlightened. The only way to deal with false prophets was to deal with the Turkish people's illiteracy and prejudice.

Religion and the individual

Religion, particularly Islam, was between an individual and God in Atatürk's eyes.  He believed it was possible to blend native tradition (based on Islam) and Western modernism harmoniously. In this equation, he gave more emphasis towards the modernization. His modernization aimed to transform social and mental structures (native traditions of Islam) to eradicate the irrational ideas, magical superstitions and so on.

Atatürk was not against religion but what he perceived as all Ottoman religious and cultural elements that brought limits to people's self being. He concentrated his reforms (regarding popular sovereignty) against obstacles for the individual choices being reflected in the social life. He viewed civil law and abolition of the caliphate as required for reflection of individual choices. He perceived religion as a matter of conscience or worship, but not politics. The best response on this issue comes from himself:

Atatürk believed in freedom of religion, but he was a secular thinker and his concept of freedom of religion was not limitless. He differentiated between social and personal practice of religion. He applied social considerations (secular requirements) when the public practice of religion was considered. He said that no one can force another to accept any religion or a sect (freedom of belief). Also, everyone has the right to perform or neglect, if he so wishes, obligations of any religion he chooses (freedom of worship), such as the right to not fast during Ramadan.

Religion and politics
According to historian Kemal Karpat, the movements that perceive Islam as a political movement or particularly the view of Islam as a political religion hold the position that Atatürk was not a "true believer" or "religious Muslim". It is normal that this perspective was adapted, Karpat says: "He was not against Islam, but those who are against his political power using the religious arguments."

Andrew Mango wrote in his book Atatürk: The Biography of the Founder of Modern Turkey (1999):

On 1 November 1937, his speech in parliament he said:

Religion of the Arabs
Atatürk described Islam as the religion of the Arabs in his own work titled Vatandaş için Medeni Bilgiler by his own critical and nationalist views:

Last days, 1937–1938
During 1937, indications of Atatürk's worsening health started to appear. In the early 1938, while he was on a trip to Yalova, he suffered from a serious illness. After a short period of treatment in Yalova, an apparent improvement in his health was observed, but his condition again worsened following his journeys first to Ankara, and then to Mersin and Adana. Upon his return to Ankara in May, he was recommended to go to Istanbul for treatment, where he was diagnosed with cirrhosis of the liver. 

During his stay in Istanbul, he made an effort to keep up with his regular lifestyle for a while, heading the Council of Ministers meeting, working on the Hatay issue, and hosting King Carol II of Romania during his visit in June. He stayed on board his newly arrived yacht, Savarona, until the end of July, after which his health again worsened and then he moved to a room arranged for him at the Dolmabahçe Palace.

Death and funeral 

Atatürk died at the Dolmabahçe Palace in Istanbul, on 10 November 1938, at 09:05 am, aged 57. It is thought that he died of cirrhosis of the liver. Atatürk's funeral called forth both sorrow and pride in Turkey, and seventeen countries sent special representatives, while nine contributed with armed detachments to the cortège.

In November 1953, Atatürk's remains were taken from the Ethnography Museum of Ankara by 138 young reserve officers in a procession that stretched for  including the president, the premier, every cabinet minister, every parliamentary deputy, every provincial governor and every foreign diplomat.

One admiral guarded a velvet cushion which bore the Medal of Independence; the only decoration, among many others held, that Atatürk preferred to wear. The Father of the Turks finally came to rest at his mausoleum, the Anıtkabir. An official noted: "I was on active duty during his funeral, when I shed bitter tears at the finality of death. Today I am not sad, for 15 years have taught me that Atatürk will never die."

His lifestyle had always been strenuous. Alcohol consumption during dinner discussions, smoking, long hours of hard work, very little sleep, and working on his projects and dreams had been his way of life. As the historian Will Durant had said, "men devoted to war, politics, and public life wear out fast, and all three had been the passion of Atatürk."

Will
In his will written on 5 September 1938, he donated all of his possessions to the Republican People's Party, bound to the condition that, through the yearly interest of his funds, his sister Makbule and his adopted children will be looked after, the higher education of the children of İsmet İnönü will be funded, and the Turkish Language Association and Turkish Historical Society will be given the rest.

Publications

Atatürk published many books and kept a journal throughout his military career. Atatürk's daily journals and military notes during the Ottoman period were published as a single collection. Another collection covered the period between 1923 and 1937 and indexes all the documents, notes, memorandums, communications (as a President) under multiple volumes, titled Atatürk'ün Bütün Eserleri ("All of the Works of Atatürk").

The list of books edited and authored by Atatürk is given below ordered by the date of publication:
 Takımın Muharebe Tâlimi, published in 1908 (Translation from German)
 Cumalı Ordugâhı – Süvâri: Bölük, Alay, Liva Tâlim ve Manevraları, published in 1909
 Ta’biye ve Tatbîkat Seyahati, published in 1911
 Bölüğün Muharebe Tâlimi, published in 1912 (Translation from German)
 Ta’biye Mes’elesinin Halli ve Emirlerin Sûret-i Tahrîrine Dâir Nasâyih, published in 1916
 Zâbit ve Kumandan ile Hasb-ı Hâl, published in 1918
 Nutuk, published in 1927
 Vatandaş için Medeni Bilgiler, published in 1930 (For high school civic classes)
 Geometri, published in 1937 (For high school math classes)

See also
Timeline of Mustafa Kemal Atatürk

Notes

References

Sources

 Prints

 Journals

News

Web

Personal life
Atatürk
Articles containing video clips
Atatürk